Force ennemie	(1903; English: Enemy Force) is a novel by French author John Antoine Nau. It won the inaugural Prix Goncourt in 1903.

In 2010 Michael Shreve adapted it into English as Enemy Force.

Plot summary
The main character is a poet who mysteriously wakes up in a rubber room, locked away in a lunatic asylum, apparently at the request of a relative due to alcoholism or perhaps jealousy. He then becomes possessed by an "Alien Force" from another planet, Kmôhoûn, whose crazy voice is constantly screaming in his head. He then falls in love with a female inmate, Irene, but she leaves and so he follows her to the ends of the earth, while the Alien Force cohabits his body.

Critical reception
It won the inaugural Prix Goncourt in 1903. The novel was only a mediocre success, but it did not prevent the president of the academy, Joris-Karl Huysmans, to say much later: "It is still the best we have crowned." In 1906, Paul Léautaud said "The Prix Goncourt has really only been given once—the first time to Nau."

See also 
 1903 in science fiction

References

External links
Excerpt from Enemy Force, from The Brooklyn Rail InTranslation, August 2009.
  Force ennemie, version audio 

1903 French novels
1903 science fiction novels
French science fiction novels
Prix Goncourt winning works